Manuel Machado y Ruiz (29 August 1874 in Seville – 19 January 1947 in Madrid) was a Spanish poet and a prominent member of the Generation of 98.

Manuel Machado was the son of Antonio Machado Álvarez, a known folklorist Seville nicknamed "Demófilo", and Ana Ruiz. His brothers were also poets: Antonio Machado and José Machado.
He inherited his father's love of the popular Andalusian character. Manuel was born in San Pedro Martir Street No. 20, spending his childhood in the Palacio de las Dueñas, where his family had rented one of the zones reserved for individuals. His whole family moved to Madrid when Manuel was 9, because his paternal grandfather had obtained a professorship at the Universidad Central. The desire of all the three brothers was to study in the Free Institution of Teaching, led by Francisco Giner de los Ríos, who was a great friend of the Manuel's grandfather.

Later, the family moved to Madrid, where Manuel progressed in his studies, culminating with a Bachelor of Arts. After that, his family returned to Seville on only a few occasions, but Seville and Andalusia were in his mind as a living reference, however distant, for the love of his parents towards their land.

In Madrid, Manuel began to publicize his first poetry and contributed to several literary publications in Madrid along with writers like Francis and Juan Ramón Jiménez Villaespesa.

He was co-founder of the Association of Friends of the Soviet Union on February 11, 1933. 

Over the years, he became director of Madrid's Municipal Library (now the Municipal Historical Library) and the Municipal Museum. He created several short-lived literary magazines and worked in daily newspapers in Europe and America.

Machado contributed strongly to the modernist poetry, and understood its colorful, decadent and cosmopolitan themes, and that giving a hint of Andalusian poetry makes something unique. This has often been opposed to the modernist side of the 98 Generation.

In 1936, during the civil war, Manuel was appointed to a seat in the Royal Spanish Academy.

In collaboration with his brother Antonio, he and Manuel wrote several dramatic works in the Andalusian style. Manuel's most notable work is La Lola se va a los puertos, adapted into film twice.

Other dramatic works by Machado were the La duquesa de Benamejí, La prima Fernanda, Juan de Mañara, El hombre que murió en la guerra and Desdichas de la fortuna o Julianillo Valcárcel.

Although the poetry of the two brothers is very different, we can see certain parallels. Thus, both composed autobiographical poems ("Adelfos" Manuel, and "Portrait", by Antonio) using Alexandrine verses organized in serventesios. The civil war separated the brothers, placing them on opposite sides.

Upon arrival in Madrid after the Spanish coup of July 1936, Manuel gave the military an encomiastic poetry, "The sword of the Caudillo." This earned him the recognition of the Nationalists. After the war he returned to his post as director of the Newspaper Library and the Municipal Museum of Madrid, and retired shortly thereafter. He continued to write poetry, mostly religious in nature. His Catholic faith was rekindled during a stay in Burgos and thanks to the devotion of his wife and the influence of certain priests, such as Bonifacio Zamora. He continued to write eulogies to various figures and symbols of Francoist Spain, which earned him the scorn of critics and later poets, who considered him a traitor to the Spanish Second Republic.

On January 19, 1947 died in Madrid. After the poet's death, his widow entered a religious order dedicated to caring for abandoned and sick children.

When the Spanish openness came of the 60s and 70s, Francisco Franco gave the youth side to the poets covered by Spain and embraced those who died, or who still lived in exile. Thus, the work and figure of Manuel Machado were eclipsed by those of Antonio Machado, more akin to the taste of the time.

Some famous poems by Manuel Machado include:

CANTARES

Vino, sentimiento, guitarra y poesía
hacen los cantares de la patria mía.
Quien dice cantares dice Andalucía.
A la sombra fresca de la vieja parra,
un mozo moreno rasguea la guitarra...
Cantares...
Algo que acaricia y algo que desgarra.

La prima que canta y el bordón que llora...
Y el tiempo callado se va hora tras hora.
Cantares...
Son dejos fatales de la raza mora.

No importa la vida, que ya está perdida,
y, después de todo, ¿qué es eso, la vida?...
Cantares...
Cantando la pena, la pena se olvida.

Madre, pena, suerte, pena, madre, muerte,
ojos negros, negros, y negra la suerte...
Cantares...
En ellos el alma del alma se vierte.

Cantares. Cantares de la patria mía,
quien dice cantares dice Andalucía.
Cantares...
No tiene más notas la guitarra mía.

CASTILLA

El ciego sol se estrella
en las duras aristas de las armas,
llaga de luz los petos y espaldares
y flamea en las puntas de las lanzas.
El ciego sol, la sed y la fatiga.
Por la terrible estepa castellana,
al destierro, con doce de los suyos
—polvo, sudor y hierro—, el Cid cabalga.
Cerrado está el mesón a piedra y lodo.
Nadie responde. Al pomo de la espada
y al cuento de las picas el postigo
va a ceder... ¡Quema el sol, el aire abrasa!
A los terribles golpes,
de eco ronco, una voz pura, de plata
y de cristal responde... Hay una niña
muy débil y muy blanca
en el umbral. Es toda
ojos azules y en los ojos lágrimas.
Oro pálido nimba
su carita curiosa y asustada.
«¡Buen Cid, pasad...! El rey nos dará muerte,
arruinará la casa,
y sembrará de sal el pobre campo
que mi padre trabaja...
Idos. El cielo os colme de venturas...
¡En nuestro mal, oh Cid no ganáis nada!»
Calla la niña y llora sin gemido...
Un sollozo infantil cruza la escuadra
de feroces guerreros,
y una voz inflexible grita «¡En marcha!»
El ciego sol, la sed y la fatiga.
Por la terrible estepa castellana,
al destierro, con doce de los suyos
—polvo, sudor y hierro—, el Cid cabalga.

LA COPLA

Sources
Curiosities about Manuel Machado and his family

External links
 

1874 births
1947 deaths
People from Seville
Spanish poets
Falangists
Writers from Andalusia
Members of the Royal Spanish Academy
Spanish people of the Spanish Civil War (National faction)
Spanish male poets